The 15th Toronto International Film Festival (TIFF) took place in Toronto, Canada between September 6 and September 15, 1990. Gerald Pratley introduced Cinematheque Ontario now known as TIFF Cinematheque at the festival, when the festival assumed management of the Ontario Film Institute.

Awards

Programme

Gala Presentation
Cyrano de Bergerac by Jean-Paul Rappeneau
An Angel at My Table by Jane Campion
Open Doors by Gianni Amelio
The Match Factory Girl by Aki Kaurismäki
Reversal of Fortune by Barbet Schroeder
The Grifters by Stephen Frears
The Krays by Peter Medak
¡Ay Carmela! by Carlos Saura
Rosencrantz & Guildenstern Are Dead by Tom Stoppard
The Hot Spot by Dennis Hopper
The Reflecting Skin by Philip Ridley
Szürkület by György Fehér
Paris by Night by David Hare
O Processo do Rei by João Mário Grilo 
A Tale of Springtime by Éric Rohmer
White Hunter Black Heart by Clint Eastwood
The Long Walk Home by Richard Pearce
Storia di ragazzi e di ragazze by Pupi Avati

Canadian Perspective
Archangel by Guy Maddin
The Company of Strangers by Cynthia Scott
Defy Gravity by Michael Gibson
Falling Over Backwards by Mort Ransen
The Famine Within by Katherine Gilday
Five Feminist Minutes
Getting Married in Buffalo Jump by Eric Till
H by Darrell Wasyk
Hotel Chronicles by Léa Pool
An Imaginary Tale (Une histoire inventée) by André Forcier
The Moving Statue (La Liberté d'une statue) by Olivier Asselin
Moody Beach by Richard Roy
Musicians in Exile by Jacques Holender
No Apologies by Ken Pittman
Paper Wedding (Les Noces du papier) by Michel Brault
The Party (Le Party) by Pierre Falardeau
Perfectly Normal by Yves Simoneau
Princes in Exile by Giles Walker
White Room by Patricia Rozema

Midnight Madness
Two Evil Eyes by George A. Romero & Dario Argento
Bride of Re-Animator by Brian Yuzna
Hardware by Richard Stanley
My Degeneration by Jon Moritsugu
The Church by Michele Soavi
Frankenhooker by Frank Henenlotter
Def by Temptation by James Bond III
Meet The Feebles by Peter Jackson
Tetsuo: The Iron Man by Shinya Tsukamoto

Documentaries
Resident Alien by Jonathan Nossiter
Step Across the Border by Nicolas Humbert and Werner Penzel

References

External links
 Official site
 TIFF: A Reel History: 1976 - 2012
1990 Toronto International Film Festival at IMDb

1990
1990 film festivals
1990 in Toronto
1990 in Canadian cinema